Ayaví District is one of sixteen districts of the province Huaytará in Peru.

References